Lieutenant General Charles Churchill (1679 – 14 May 1745) was a British Army General and a Member of Parliament.

Career
Born the natural (illegitimate) son of Elizabeth Dodd and General Charles Churchill (1656–1714) and so the nephew of the 1st Duke of Marlborough, Churchill spent his early career in the British Army during the War of the Spanish Succession and was then Member of Parliament for Castle Rising from 1715 to 1745.

He was despatched to Vienna in 1721 on a mission to secure the release of a "Mr Knight" who was being held in the Citadel of Antwerp. 

In 1727, he was promoted to Brigadier and appointed a Groom of the Bedchamber and in 1728 King George II and Queen Caroline inspected his Regiment of Dragoons.

He was also Governor of the Royal Hospital Chelsea from 1720 until 1722. and Governor of Plymouth.

Family
He was married to Catherine, younger daughter of Sir Henry Hobart, 4th Baronet; she died on 2 June 1725. Churchill had a relationship with Anne Oldfield, an English actress, by whom he had an illegitimate son, Charles Churchill (of Chalfont). He also had an illegitimate daughter, Harriet, whose mother is uncertain. Harriet married Sir Everard Fawkener and, later, Thomas Pownall.

References

|-

|-

1679 births
1745 deaths
10th Royal Hussars officers
16th The Queen's Lancers officers
British Army lieutenant generals
British military personnel of the War of the Spanish Succession
British MPs 1715–1722
British MPs 1722–1727
British MPs 1727–1734
British MPs 1734–1741
British MPs 1741–1747
Members of the Parliament of Great Britain for English constituencies
Ambassadors of Great Britain to the Holy Roman Emperor